Páez may refer to:

Places

Colombia
 Páez, Boyacá, a municipality in Boyacá Department
 Páez, Cauca, a municipality in Cauca Department
 Páez River

Venezuela
 Páez, Apure, a municipality in the state of Apure
 Páez, Miranda, a municipality in the state of Miranda
 Páez, Portuguesa, a municipality in the state of Portuguesa
 Páez, Zulia, a municipality in the state of Zulia

Other uses
 Páez (surname)
 Páez people, of the southwestern highlands of Colombia
 Páez language, the language of the Páez people
 Paezan languages, a hypothetical language family of Colombia and Ecuador